The 2008 Tamworth Borough Council election took place on 1 May 2008 to elect members of Tamworth Borough Council in Staffordshire, England. One third of the council was up for election and the Conservative Party stayed in overall control of the council.

After the election, the composition of the council was:
Conservative 24
Labour 5
Independent 1

Background
Before the election the Conservatives held 23 seats, Labour had 6 and there was 1 independent councillor. 10 seats were being contested, with the Conservatives defending 8 and Labour 2. Among the councillors defending seats were the former Conservative council leader Ron Cook in Spittal ward and the Mayoress Mary Oates in Wilnecote. Labour would have needed to gain every Conservative seat that was being contested in order to deprive the Conservatives of a majority.

Election result
The results in Tamworth were one of the first local election results to be declared and saw just one seat change hands. The Conservative party gained Galscote ward from the Labour to hold 24 seats, compared to 5 for Labour. Galscote was taken by Conservative, Nicola Annandale, who was the fiancee of the leader of the council Jeremy  Oates. Overall turnout was 29.97%.

The Conservative leader of the council Jeremy Oates said that voters were "fed up of party politics and have voted on the delivery of services". However the Labour Member of Parliament for Tamworth, Brian Jenkins said that people had wanted "to give the Government a kicking" and that the election had been "all about national issues".

Ward results

References

2008
2008 English local elections
2000s in Staffordshire